Canik is one of the main municipalities in Samsun, Turkey.

Canik may also refer to:

Canik Mountains, Turkey
Canik beyliks, a group of beyliks, Turkey, historical
Canik TP9, Turkish version of Walther P99 pistol